Maryon Wilson Park is a public park on Thorntree Road, Charlton, in the Royal Borough of Greenwich in south east London.

Together with the neighbouring Maryon Park and Gilbert's Pit, it is a Local Nature Reserve, and forms part of the South East London Green Chain.

History
The park is a remnant of ancient forest once known as Hanging Wood (the word 'hang' comes from the Old English 'hangra', a wooded slope), reputedly a haunt of highwaymen; a road, Hanging Wood Lane, ran through the area that later formed the park. The wood was formerly part of the estate of Charlton Manor, owned by the Maryon Wilson family from 1767 until 1925. Sir Spencer Maryon Wilson had provided land for the creation of nearby Maryon Park in 1890, and in 1925 the family donated further land to Greenwich Borough Council, and Maryon Wilson Park was opened by London County Council in 1926.

Animal park
The park is known for its animal park where tours are conducted (although not required); tours typically take two hours and give children the opportunity to feed, pet and interact with the animals. Free public tours are led by the Park Ranger Service every Wednesday starting at 1.30 pm. The tours are strictly limited to the first 50 people on the day. Tours begin at the deer pen.

In 2011, the animal park was threatened with closure after Greenwich council withdrew its funding.

References

External links
Maryon Wilson Park on the VisitWoods website

Parks and open spaces in the Royal Borough of Greenwich
Local nature reserves in Greater London
Nature reserves in the Royal Borough of Greenwich
Charlton, London